Yanda Parish, (Yanda County) is a civil parish, of Yanda County, a cadasteral division of New South Wales;  a Cadastral division of New South Wales.

Geography

The topography is flat with a Köppen climate classification of BsK (Hot semi arid). The climate is characterised by hot summers and mild winters. The
annual average rainfall is 350 mm, although this is highly variable.

Much of the Parish is in the Gundabooka National Park and adjoining conservation area.

References

Central West (New South Wales)
Localities in New South Wales
Geography of New South Wales
Populated places in New South Wales